Nelson Azevedo-Janelas (born 12 February 1998) is a Belgian footballer who is currently a free agent.

International career
Azevedo-Janelas was born in Belgium and is of Portuguese descent. He was a youth international for Belgium.

References

External links

1998 births
Living people
Belgian footballers
Belgium youth international footballers
Belgian people of Portuguese descent
R.S.C. Anderlecht players
Belgian Pro League players
Association football midfielders
People from Mouscron
Footballers from Hainaut (province)